Lý Hoàng Nam (born 25 February 1997) is a Vietnamese tennis player.

Nam has a career high ATP singles ranking of 231 achieved on November 28, 2022. He also has a career high ATP doubles ranking of 385 achieved on 12 November 2018.

He won the 2015 Wimbledon Championships – Boys' doubles title along with his Indian partner Sumit Nagal, defeating Reilly Opelka and Akira Santillan in the final, becoming the first Vietnamese tennis player to win a Grand Slam trophy.

Nam represents Vietnam at the Davis Cup, where he has a win–loss record of 25–10.

Junior Grand Slam finals

Boys' doubles

ATP Challenger and ITF Future/World Tennis Tour finals

Singles: 21 (10–11)

Doubles: 14 (6–8)

External links

1997 births
Living people
Vietnamese male tennis players
Wimbledon junior champions
People from Tây Ninh province
Southeast Asian Games bronze medalists for Vietnam
Southeast Asian Games medalists in tennis
Tennis players at the 2018 Asian Games
Competitors at the 2017 Southeast Asian Games
Asian Games competitors for Vietnam
Grand Slam (tennis) champions in boys' doubles
Competitors at the 2019 Southeast Asian Games
Southeast Asian Games gold medalists for Vietnam
Competitors at the 2021 Southeast Asian Games
20th-century Vietnamese people
21st-century Vietnamese people